Francisco Marco Chillet was a Mexican art director. He designed the sets for over a hundred films and worked on a number of productions during the Golden Age of Mexican cinema.

Selected filmography
 The Shack (1945)
 Juan Charrasqueado (1948)
 Spurs of Gold (1948)
 Hypocrite (1949)
 Women of the Theatre (1951)
 Port of Temptation (1951)
 En La Palma de Tu Mano (1951)
 We Maids (1951)
 In the Palm of Your Hand (1951)
 The Bandits of Cold River (1956)

References

Bibliography 
 Román Gubern. El Cine Español en el Exilio. Lumen, 1976.

External links 
 

Ariel Award winners
Year of birth unknown
Year of death unknown
Mexican art directors